Samea castoralis is a moth in the family Crambidae. It is found on Borneo and in the Philippines, Cambodia, China and India.

References

Moths described in 1859
Spilomelinae